Busy Buses is an animated children's program about the lives of a group of friendly talking buses. It was originally shown on Tiny Living. It also aired on ABC in Australia and TV3 in New Zealand, and ran for two series between 2002.

Production
Busy Buses is a 3D CGI animated television series made for 'children' aged 3 to 6. Set in a fictional town of Chumley, it features a bus garage and eight colourful bus characters. Brian Conley narrates the stories, and he has also created the voices for all the Busy Buses along with its theme tune.

The series was a tv4c (joint venture between Chatsworth Television, and Flicks Films) it was created, directed and produced by Terry Ward. (Mr Men, Little Miss, Bananaman, Nellie the Elephant)

Episodes

Series One (2002)

Series Two (2002)

 "Sammy's New Friend" – Sammy is out on the school run when he meets another bus who looks just like him, except in a different colour – and they soon make friends.
 "The Football Match" – There is a football match between the Chumley buses and the Nettlefidget Rovers buses. Sammy badly wants to play in the annual Chumley football match, but the other buses think he is too young. When Roger starts to break down, he eventually gets his chance.
 "Busy Bangers" – Mr. Spector mistakenly gives the buses the wrong type of fuel causing all sorts of problems throughout the day.
 "Sammy the Stunt Bus" – Sammy goes to the airport with Roger, but he gets stuck in a multi-story car park when he sneaks off to watch the planes.
 "A Day on the Farm" – When the buses are enjoying a nice relaxing Sunday, Farmer Waggle's tractor has broken down, and the buses are called out to help him.
 "Sammy becomes a Scout" – Sammy takes the local scout group to Nettlefidget Woods on a camping trip. But the road heading to the woods is closed for emergency repair work. But Sammy has other ideas, a random shortcut which includes driving through the river and some fields!
 "Stephanie Loses her Nerve" – Stephanie is too scared to leave the garage and so the other buses try a plan to help. Meanwhile, Sammy breaks down on Cowslip Down.
 "A Muddy Day" – It's a rainy day and none of the buses want to go outside; except Colin, who loves the mud.
 "Sammy Gets Taller" – Sammy is upset that he is shorter than the other buses, and comes up with some odd ways to make himself taller. Meanwhile, Roger gets stuck in a new airport tunnel and Sammy rushes to the rescue.
 "Sammy's Midnight Adventure" – Tommy comes to visit again and stays over in the garage. He and Sammy sneak out during the night to see the sights of Chumley.
 "One Eyed Roger" – Roger has had a busy day but needs to make a late night trip to the airport. When one of his headlights goes out on the way, he gets into trouble.
 "Rick the Racing Bus" – Sammy is going in for a full service and Rick comes to stand in for him, however Rick, his replacement, drives too fast and makes everyone sick.
 "The Big Parade" – Buses from far and wide come to Chumley to take part in a big bus parade to choose 'Bus of the Year'.

Broadcast
In August 2001, the series was pre-sold to ABC Kids and Nickelodeon Australia.

Home media

United Kingdom
The show was released on DVD in the United Kingdom by Metrodome Distribution.
 Busy Buses – 17 February 2003
 The Series: 26 Episodes. – 2 May 2003
 Sammy's Midnight Adventure – 11 July 2005
 Sammy in the Snow –  17 October 2005
 Sammy Wins The Day – 7 November 2005

Australia
The series was released in Australia on DVD by ABC Video/Roadshow.

 Series Two – 7 October 2005 (Australia only)
 Colin Needs a Bath (Australia release)
 Sammy's New Friend (Australia release)
 Sammy the Acrobatic Bus (Australia release)

References

2000s British animated television series
2000s British children's television series
British children's animated adventure television series
British children's animated comedy television series
2003 British television series debuts
2003 British television series endings